Eviota is a genus of fish in the family Gobiidae, commonly as dwarfgobies found in the Indo-Pacific region, where it is distributed from Japan to Australia and from Africa to Pitcairn Island. Species are mainly associated with coral reefs. Many of these fish are short-lived, with life cycles as brief as 3.5 weeks in the tropics. Some species are hermaphrodites and some representatives live symbiotically among the tentacles of the mushroom coral.

Species
These are the currently recognized species in this genus:

References

 
Gobiidae
Marine fish genera
Taxa named by Oliver Peebles Jenkins